Taecyeon Special: Winter Hitori or Taecyeon Special ～Winter Hitori～ is the first Japanese album by South Korean artist, Ok Taec-yeon, member of South Korean boy band 2PM. It was released on January 18, 2017.

Background and release
On November 19, 2016, a 15-second preview of the music video for "Winter 一人" was uploaded on 2PM Japan Official YouTube Channel. A special website was introduced where Taecyeon Special ～Winter Hitori～ was announced as Ok's debut Japanese studio album as well as Ok's Premium Solo Concert "Winter 一人" two days later. On December 5, 2016, the record label revealed album covers and tracklist for the album. A short music video for "Winter 一人" was published on December 24, prior to its full release two weeks later. "Winter 一人" was made available digitally on Ok's 28th birthday, December 27.

Ok held his first solo concert, Premium Solo Concert "Winter 一人", at Tokyo Dome City Hall to promote the album on January 2–3, 2017. 

On January 5, full music video for "Winter 一人" was released.

The album was released on January 18, in three editions:

Regular edition: CD
Limited edition A: CD + DVD
Limited edition B: CD + bonus tracks

Track listing

Sales

Charts

Release history

References

External links
 Japanese Official Website

2017 albums
Epic Records albums
Ok Taec-yeon albums
Sony Music Entertainment Japan albums